Arthur Hawley Parmelee  (September 25, 1883 – June 5, 1961) was an American physician and football coach.

Early life
Parmelee was born on September 25, 1883, in Redfield, South Dakota.  In 1891, he moved with his family to West Salem, Wisconsin, where he graduated from West Salem High School in 1900.  After a year working as a mail carrier he entered Beloit College where he received his bachelor's degree in 1905.  While at Beloit he played left tackle on the football team.

College coach

After graduation Parmelee took a position at Miami University in Oxford, Ohio.  While at Miami he served both as the General Secretary of the campus Y.M.C.A and head football coach.  In 1906, his only season as football coach he completed a 1–5–1 record.  After a 16–0 victory over Georgetown College in the first game, Parmelee’s team did not score again the rest of the season losing the rest of the games except a 0–0 tie with arch-rival Cincinnati.

Head coaching record

Medical career
In 1907 Parmelee entered Rush Medical College, where he graduated in 1911. He served internship at Kansas City General Hospital and then became an assistant to Dr. John Cross in Minneapolis. In 1913 he moved to Oak Park, Illinois, to open a practice where he specialized in pediatrics. Eventually he would also take a position the pediatric department at Rush Medical College.  In 1924 he departed for Vienna, Austria to study with Clemens von Pirquet, at the time the leading pediatrician in Europe, He would return to Vienna for additional study in 1931 and 1932. In 1947 he left his private practice and resigned from the pediatric department at Rush.  He moved to Los Angeles and became a member of the Staff at Children's Hospital Los Angeles.  In addition he was a Pediatric Consultant to the Bureau of Maternal and Child Health of the California State Department of Public Health, and Clinical Professor of Pediatrics at the USC School of Medicine.

Parmelee had a deep interest in the disorders of the newborn. He published, 44 articles with 24 were directly related to this aspect of pediatrics helping in diagnosis and treatment including early intestinal obstruction, congenital lung cysts, congenital syphilis, congenital goiter,  and diaphragmatic hernia. His most significant article was a 1935 article in the American Journal of Diseases of Children titled "The Pathology of Steatorrhea" where he was the first to recognize congenital steatorrhea (cystic fibrosis of the pancreas) as a separate disease unrelated to other steatorrheas, including celiac disease.  His work developed into a serious examination of the factors that influence the health of newborn babies. He compiled  his observations into a book “Management of the Newborn”.   Additionally, he collaborated in several textbooks including "Brennemann's Practice of Pediatrics" and "The Child in Health and Disease."

Death
Parmelee died on June 5, 1961, of a cerebral hemorrhage at the UCLA Medical Center.

References

External links
 

1883 births
1961 deaths
American football tackles
American pediatricians
Beloit Buccaneers football players
Miami RedHawks football coaches
Rush Medical College alumni
University of Southern California faculty
People from West Salem, Wisconsin
People from Redfield, South Dakota
Coaches of American football from Wisconsin
Players of American football from Wisconsin